Kinga Penjor is a Bhutanese politician who has been a member of the National Assembly of Bhutan, since October 2018.

Education 
He holds a BA (Hons) degree in Dzongkha.

Political career 
Before joining politics, he worked as a broadcast journalist.

Penjor ran unsuccessfully for the Lhuentse Dzongkhag in the 2018 Bhutanese National Council Election.

He was elected to the National Assembly of Bhutan as a candidate of DNT from Gangzur-Minjey constituency in 2018 Bhutanese National Assembly Election. He received 3,026 votes and defeated Tshering Dorji, a candidate of Druk Phuensum Tshogpa.

References 

1974 births
Living people
Bhutanese politicians
Druk Nyamrup Tshogpa politicians
Bhutanese MNAs 2018–2023
Bhutanese journalists
People from Lhuntse District
Druk Nyamrup Tshogpa MNAs